

Scooby Snacks (occasionally spelled Scooby Snax) are a fictional snack food that appear in Scooby-Doo. In the show, they are often used as an incentive by Fred, Daphne, and Velma to convince Scooby-Doo and Shaggy to participate in dangerous or frightening schemes, such as acting as bait for a monster. Shaggy and Scooby will generally refuse at first, with one of the other characters convincing them by saying, "Would you do it for a Scooby Snack?"

The fictional Scooby Snacks appear similar to biscuits and come in a cereal box-like container whose colors usually match the Mystery Machine. The name "Scooby Snacks" has also been licensed for real-life products, including both dog treats and snack foods.

Background and appearances 
Scooby Snacks have appeared in many different Scooby-Doo properties, from Scooby-Doo, Where Are You?! (1969) to Scooby-Doo! Mystery Incorporated (2010). Although they appear similar to dog treats, they seem to be eaten by humans, especially Shaggy. Producer William Hanna had always imagined that a Scooby Snack would taste like some sort of a caramel-flavored cookie. He and Joseph Barbera had previously used the concept of a dog with an affinity for dog treats in the Quick Draw McGraw character Snuffles in 1959. Similarly, Muttley from the Hanna-Barbera series Wacky Races is frequently rewarded by cohort Dick Dastardly with a medal. These characters could have provided inspiration for Scooby Snacks.

It is unclear whether Scooby Snacks are a commercial product. In the live-action made for television film Scooby-Doo! The Mystery Begins (2009), it is stated that Shaggy invented the recipe, which includes eggs, water, flour, cocoa, sugar, and dog kibble for texture. However, most animated appearances of Scooby Snacks appear to be prepackaged, and in Scooby-Doo! and the Samurai Sword (2009), Scooby Snacks can be seen on a Japanese store shelf with translated text on the box. Later, in the Be Cool, Scooby-Doo! episode "Sorcerer Snacks Scare" (2016), after the gang solves a mystery at a factory that produces "Sorcerer Snacks", the food is renamed to "Scooby Snacks" in Scooby's honor.

Scooby Snacks seem to come in many different flavors, although all boxes are identical. In the What's New, Scooby Doo? episode "Recipe for Disaster" (2004), Scooby and Shaggy are ecstatic when Shaggy wins a tour of the Scooby Snacks factory, where they attempt to sample uncooked batter before being shooed off by a worker who thinks they are trying to steal the recipe.

Scooby Snacks in real life 
Warner Bros. has licensed Scooby Snacks as both dog treats and multiple different snack foods. Vanilla wafers were packaged and sold as Scooby Snacks in Suncoast home video stores. Keebler has also introduced a line of baked graham cracker sticks shaped like cartoon bones. They come in cinnamon and honey flavors.

The official brand of dog treats is made by Snausages, a product of Del Monte Foods.

References

External links

Brand name snack foods
Fictional food and drink
Scooby-Doo